Erythrophleum suaveolens, also known as the ordeal tree, is a species of flowering plant that can be found across most of tropical Africa. The plants leaves have 2–3 pairs of pinnae, which carry 7–13 leaflets. The flowers have fluffy spikes, and are creamy-yellow coloured. Fruits are hard, the pod of which is flat.

The bark of the tree has been used in Liberia to make a toxic concoction used for a form of trial by ordeal called "sassywood". This use has given it the common name of the "Ordeal Tree".

References

External links

suaveolens
Plants described in 1832
Flora of Africa